Ardross Castle may refer to the following castles in Scotland:
 Ardross Castle, Fife, a c.14th century castle ruin near Elie and Earlsferry
 Ardross Castle, Highland, a castle in Ardross